Venkata Narasimha Reddy, professionally known as V. N. Reddy (20 November 1914 – 29 December 1991), was an Indian cinematographer and director who predominantly worked in Hindi and Telugu films for over thirty years starting from 1943. One of the pioneers of Indian cinematography, Reddy was born in Kadapa, Andhra Pradesh and was brought up in Anantapur.

Career
He developed a passion for cinematography at a very young age. Badalti Duniya, his debut movie, was released in the year 1943. He first excelled in black-and-white photography and film making and then shifted to colour film making. His noted films are Aag (1948), Hulchul (1951), Baiju Bawra (1952), Meenar (1954), Chori Chori (1956), Kashmir Ki Kali (1964), Do Badan (1966), Upkar (1967), Purab Aur Paschim (1970) and Do Chor (1972).

Aag (1948) was made by a group of people in their twenties, Reddy being the oldest. It is considered one of the most significant films of all time. Writing about Reddy's work for the song Dulhan Chali Pehan Chali from the film Purab Aur Paschim (1970), the Indian film review website, Passion for Cinema states

Lakh Tandon and V. Gopi Krishna were Reddy's assistants. Reddy also tried his hand at directing movies like Ganga Gauri Samvadam (Telugu - 1958), Sengottai Singam (Tamil - 1958), Intika Deepam Illalu (Telugu - 1961), Ananda Jyoti (Tamil - 1963), and Zahreeli (1977) among others.

Ravikant Reddy, one of Reddy's six children, who at an early age of 13 to 14 years was trained and apprenticed under his father, is a noted cinematographer himself.

Partial filmography

References

People from Kadapa
Nandi Award winners
Telugu film cinematographers
1914 births
1991 deaths
Cinematographers from Andhra Pradesh
20th-century Indian film directors
Telugu film directors
Tamil film directors
20th-century Indian photographers
Film directors from Andhra Pradesh